Moezzabad-e Jaberi (also Romanized as Mo‘ezzābād-e Jāberī; also known as Moez Ābād, Mo‘ez Abad Korbal, and Mo‘ezzābād) is a village in Korbal Rural District, in the Central District of Kharameh County, Fars Province, Iran. At the 2006 census, its population was 5,654 divided in 1,290 families.

References 

Populated places in Kharameh County